No. 50 squadron operates the Phalcon Airborne Warning, Control and Command System, bought from Israel. The Squadron participates in operations involving Aerial reconnaissance and Early Warning Missile Launches.

History
The No. 50 Squadron were raised in 2009 at Agra Airforce Station of the Central Air Command. Beriev A-50 is based on the air-frame of the Ilyushin Il-76 and fitted by Beriev with PS-90A-76 engines and Israeli radar system EL/W-2090(Phalcon) mounted on the aircraft by Israeli company Elta Electronics Industries.

Lineage
 Constituted as No. 50 Squadron on 28 May 2009

Assignments
 Red Flag exercise

Aircraft
 Beriev A-50

References

050
Air force reconnaissance units and formations